In the European Netherlands, a Municipal Health Service (GGD) is a decentralised public health organisation. Legally, the responsibility for the provision of this service lies with the municipalities. However, in practice, the municipalities work together to provide this service at a regional level, resulting in twenty-five "GGD regions". The borders of the GGD regions largely correspond to the borders of the safety regions.

GGD GHOR Nederland is the national umbrella organisation of the twenty-five Municipal Health Services and Regional Medical Assistance Organisations (GHOR).

Tasks 

Common tasks of the Municipal Health Services include:
 Children's preventive healthcare
 Infectious disease control
 Health promotion
 Environmental medicine
 Medical screening
 Travel medicine
 STD testing

COVID-19 pandemic 
During the COVID-19 pandemic in the Netherlands, the Municipal Health Services have been tasked with setting up large testing and vaccination sites across the country. They also bear the responsibility for carrying out contact tracing.

GGD regions

See also 
 National Institute for Public Health and the Environment (RIVM)
 Dutch Association of Mental Health and Addiction Care (GGZ)

References

External links 
 

Medical and health organisations based in the Netherlands
Government health agencies